Tamam Al-Akhal (born 1935) is a Palestinian artist and educator living in Jordan.

Born in Jaffa, the daughter of  Aref Al Akhal, in 1948, Al-Akhal left with her family to live in a refugee camp in Lebanon. She studied at the Fine Arts College in Cairo. From 1957 to 1960, she taught art at the Makassed Girls College in Beirut. In 1959, she married Ismail Shammout. Her husband died in 2006.

Al-Akhal has exhibited in Egypt, Lebanon, Jerusalem, Jordan, the United States, Kuwait, England, China, Morocco, Berlin, Paris, Rome, and Vienna.  She gave a series of lectures at the Jordan National Gallery of Fine Arts in 2009.

Her art appeared on more than a dozen covers of Palestinian Affairs, a magazine published by the Palestine Liberation Organization (PLO). She was also head of the PLO's Arts and Heritage section. With her husband, she painted a series of large murals known as "Palestine: The Exodus and the Odyssey."

''It is generally known that an artist must articulate the true essence and spirit of the era in which he lives, regardless of what the subject is about. Art will never be the art of the past or the present, but art for all time, and in order to be immortal, it must be original and true to the facts."

References 

1935 births
Living people
Palestinian women artists
People from Jaffa
College of Fine Arts in Cairo alumni